Bowman is a census-designated place and unincorporated community in Cumberland County, Tennessee, United States. It is located off U.S. Route 127 north of Crossville, south of Clarkrange, and west of the Catoosa Wildlife Management Area.  Its population was 302 as of the 2010 census.

The community was named for Nathaniel Bowman, a pioneer settler.

Demographics

References

Census-designated places in Cumberland County, Tennessee
Census-designated places in Tennessee
Unincorporated communities in Tennessee